Montblanc is a commune in the Hérault department in the Occitanie region in southern France.

Richard Nougier was the mayor for the village from 1989 till his death on April 29, 2016, of a heart attack. The village elected Claude Allingri to finish his term through 2020.

Population

International relations
Montblanc is twinned with:
Montblanc, Spain

See also
Communes of the Hérault department

References

Communes of Hérault